Rhizophora apiculata (R. apiculata) belongs to the Plantae kingdom under the Rhizophoraceae family. Currently R. apiculata is distributed throughout Australia (Queensland and Northern Territory), Guam, India, Indonesia, Malaysia, Micronesia, New Caledonia, Papua New Guinea, the Philippines, Singapore, the Solomon Islands, Sri Lanka, Taiwan, the Maldives, Thailand, Vanuatu, and Vietnam. Rhizophora apiculata is called ‘bakhaw lalaki,’ in the Philippines, "Thakafathi ތަކަފަތި"  in the Maldives, 'Đước' in Vietnam, Garjan in India, as well as other vernacular names.

R. apiculata has a C4 plant morphology that best adapts the plant for high temperature low water climates, enabling the plant to thrive in tropical environments due to the diffuse CO2 whilst limiting the amount of water transpired out of the leaves.

It's located exclusively in the mangrove ecosystem due to an affinity with wet, muddy and silty sediments. Due to the high salt concentrations of the soils it has mechanisms (ultrafiltration)  in place to reduce the likely impacts associated with increased salt in plant physiology (drying plant material down causing increased evapotranspiration). Rhizophora apiculata, as well as Rhizophora mucronata, is used to make charcoal in the charcoal kilns of Kuala Sepetang in Perak, Malaysia. Rhizophora apiculata is used within mangrove plantation specifically for wood, and charcoal production in many parts of Thailand; Yeesarn village of Smaut Songkram Province for instance.

There are a variety of alternative uses for R. apiculata including medically (to inhibit fungal infections), and commercially to reinforce nets, ropes and fishing lines, transform into charcoal or trade for income.

Anatomy and Taxonomy

Description 

Rhizophora Apiculata (R. apiculata) belongs to the Plantae kingdom under the Rhizophoraceae family. Size of R. apiculata is  dependent on geographical factors (climate and soil specifically); on average a mature R. apiculata reaches between 5 – 8 metres in height however has the potential to reach up to 30 – 40 metres.

Trunk Size 
The dimensions of the trunk depends on the age of the plant however its maturity can be as big as 50cm in diameter alongside being typically a dark grey colour. The trunk size is highly dependent on the nutrients within the soil as they will be the underlying factor for growth with water abundance being high.

Variation Within Species

Leaves 

The openings established by the cork warts enable a pathway for air to be trapped within the aerenchyma that is then stored. The air after being stored is heated by the sun causing the air to expand and enlarge the leaf. Aerenchyma in plants are integral for growth and functionality alongside enabling roots to function in ‘oxygen deprived’ (anoxic) substrates.

Due to the differences in morphology between R. apiculata with vs. without cork warts an added effect can be seen contributing to a reduced amount of light intake as the cross section for chlorophyll will be limited as a result. This will overall limit the growth potential between R. apiculata with vs. without cork warts as if environmental were controlled a reduction in growth potential will occur.

These were originally thought to be exclusive to R. apiculata however R. racemosa have also shown this same trait develop. The distribution of R. apiculata plays a role in whether this adaptation will be present or not with regions north and west of the New Guinea Coast having this trait present whereby south and east of the New Guinea Coast don't have this trait. The presence of this adaptation is directly related to the environment in which its located as anoxic substrates will likely have this characteristic due to it being favourable to survivability.

Roots 
R. apiculata also has two types of adventitious roots; Aerial Prop Roots and Stilt Roots. Both types of roots are an adaptation undertaken due to environmental factors, designed to withstand/resist; large waves, rough tides, strong winds and tropical storms. Roots also have two main forces that govern the amount of water uptake potential. These include hydrostatic (which distributes the water taken up by the root to each of its organs) and osmotic force (uses negative water pressure in the roots to suck up water from the soil).

Aerial Prop Roots 

Due to the habitat in which R. apiculata lies the roots possess a special trait designed to anchor the plant to the soil. It still acts as a normal root through in-taking both water and nutrients with the only difference being it descends from the branches. Aerial roots anchor the plant to the soil in this case due to the soil being heavily saturated with water, movement of the plant without aerial prop roots will lead to the plant being uprooted (separation from the soil leading to plant death).

Stilt Roots 
Stilt roots are lateral roots that originate from the base of the stem downwards into the substrate. Another very common type of root possessed by R. apiculata is Stilt Roots that act as additional support and an anchor. The location of the R. apiculata will determine the type of effect placed onto the stilt root for instance; if the stilt root grows downward and finds water then it will continuously grow downwards until soil from the ocean floor or it meets a substrate it can grow around. If the stilt root reaches soil first it will grow underground expanding the root system then grows additional stilt roots from the original that grew unilaterally upwards. This process is necessary for the plant to increase carbon sequestration alongside providing additional stability from being uprooted. Including R. apiculata there are a variety of mangrove plants that possess stilt roots for instance R. mucronata, and R. stylosa.

Ultra-filtration 
The process of roots absorbing both water and nutrients is a fundamental process responsible for growth, however due to the environment in which R. apiculata grows being notably high in salt levels. The roots undergo a process called ultra-filtration to eliminate any salt from entering the plant however any salt taken up will be stored in old leaves that will eventually fall and die eliminating the salt capacity within the plant.

Distribution and Habitat

Habitat 
R. apiculata is found within the mangrove ecosystem; a unique and complex location known for its humid climate, saline environment, waterlogged soils and capable of tolerating salinity ranging from 2-90%.

Soil 
The habitat of R. apiculata is the mangroves for which there are common similarities between all mangroves around the world. These include; saline, anoxic, acidic and frequently waterlogged for which the majority of nutrients are brought in via tidal inundation (the use of waves and water movement to move sediments thus supplying nutrients). As R. apiculata is condensed over a variety of locations a detailed summary of the soil composition is unobtainable as they are ever changing and vary based on location.

Environmental Impacts 
There is currently a positive correlation between R. apiculata and improving water quality through “filtration, adsorption, co-sedimentation, absorption, and microbial decomposition”. As a result of water quality improvement the likelihood of diseases caused by bacteria, parasites, fungi, and environmental pressure impacting both flora and fauna will be reduced. This reduction is especially essential as a recent study by Dai et al. (2020) found data supporting microbiota being able to reduce the numbers of mud crab exponentially which are a key driver within the mangrove ecosystem.

Biodiversity Impacts 

This impacts the aquatic animals positively as Dai et al. (2020) deduced that R. apiculata is able to change the composition of mud crab gut microbiota. This change will lead to the mud crab living longer and healthier with an added effect being on the crustaceans weight. This idea revolves around microbiota in which due to R. apiculata positively influencing this it will in turn positively influences the marine life in which it resides.

Distribution 
The distribution of mangroves are directly linked with the distribution of R. apiculata, whereby it is primarily located on the equator in tropical landscapes including tropical Asia, Pakistan, Vietnam, Hainan, Malaysia and Northern Australia. As noted within the physiology associated with R. apiculata the distribution will be closely linked to the favoured characteristics of this plant to its environment.

Seed Dispersal 
R. apiculata undertakes reproduction through two methods; viviparity and wind dispersal. Viviparity occurs when the embryo grows through the seed coat whilst still attached to the plant prior to dropping into the water. Once dropped into water it will travel and if a suitable site for germination occurs it will establish itself. The other method for reproduction occurs as flowers are self-compatible and usually wind pollinated.

Commercial Uses 
R. apiculata has a wide range of commercial uses that makes the plant quite integral to the region.

Common Uses 
It was and still is an integral aspect plant that has been exploited due to its availability and quality of timber. Currently there are plantations preexisting that allow for R. apiculata to be farmed and transformed into charcoal; resulting in renewable energy alongside potential income sources. Amongst the physical uses associated with the wood of R. apiculata the bark itself is also rich in a chemical Tannin commonly used to strengthen fishing lines, ropes and nets. Amongst this the bark also acts as a leather tanning and antidote to dysentery (intestinal inflammation).

Medicinal Purposes 
Due to R. apiculata being rich in Tannin the chemical extracts from bark, roots and leaves naturally inhibits a variety of fungal infections; for instance Ethanol extracts from R. apiculata inhibit Candida albicans, a common type of yeast infection. As seen within Baishya et al. (2020) extraction procedures include drying, shortly followed by grinding the bark, leaves and roots, the organic solvents will be used in crude extraction followed by a rotor evaporator.

Indigenous Practices 
Due to these factors it's been hypothesised that the spread of the species east was assisted by indigenous people. Aboriginal used R. apiculata for food; harvesting mangrove worms, medically; to treat sores and for ceremonial armbands however due to the chemical composition of the bark it was also used as firewood.

Rare hybrid
When bred with 'bakauan bato' (Rhizophora stylosa), the product is a rare hybrid species of mangrove, called "Rhizophora x lamarckii", which was discovered on April, 2008, by Filipino scientists in Masinloc, Zambales. Only one tree was found on Panay Island in Western Visayas, while 12 were discovered in Masinloc, and they have an average diameter of 5.5 centimeters and height of 6 meters.

In Maldives Rhizophora apiculata is commonly mistaken by locals with Rhizophora mangle. This species of plant is only found in Kaafu Atoll Hura.

References

External links

apiculata
Mangroves
Malpighiales of Australia
Trees of the Indian subcontinent
Trees of Malesia
Trees of the Pacific
Trees of Papuasia
Trees of Taiwan
Trees of Thailand
Trees of Vietnam
Least concern flora of Australia
Flora of the Northern Territory
Flora of Queensland
Least concern biota of Queensland
Least concern plants
Taxonomy articles created by Polbot
Central Indo-Pacific flora